Atractus is a genus of colubrid ground snakes in the subfamily Dipsadinae. The genus includes more than 140 distinct species.

Geographic range
Snakes of the genus Atractus are endemic to Central and South America.

Description
In the genus Atractus the maxilla is short, with 8–12 teeth; the maxillary and mandibular teeth decrease in size posteriorly. The head is not distinct from the neck. The eye is small, with a round or subelliptic pupil. The nostril is between two nasal scales. The preocular is usually absent, and the loreal and prefrontal scales enter the orbit. The body is cylindrical. The dorsal scales are smooth, without apical pits, in 15 or 17 rows. The ventral scales are rounded. The tail can be either short or rather long. The subcaudals are paired.

Reproduction
The genus Atractus is oviparous.

Species
The following species are recognized as being valid.

Nota bene: A binomial authority in parentheses indicates that the species was originally described in a genus other than Atractus.

Atractus aboiporu 
Atractus acheronius 
Atractus akerios 
Atractus albuquerquei Cunha & Nascimento, 1983 – Albuquerque ground snake
Atractus alphonsehogei Cunha & Nascimento, 1983 – Alphonse's ground snake
Atractus altagratiae 
Atractus alytogrammus 
Atractus andinus Prado, 1944 – Andean ground snake
Atractus apophis 
Atractus arangoi Prado, 1940 – brown ground snake, big ground snake
Atractus atlas Passos, Scanferla, Melo-Sampaio, Brito & Almendariz, 2018 – atlas ground snake
Atractus atratus 
Atractus attenuatus 
Atractus avernus 
Atractus ayeush 
Atractus badius (F. Boie, 1827) – Boie's ground snake 
Atractus biseriatus Prado, 1941 – two-lined ground snake
Atractus bocki F. Werner, 1909 – Bock's ground snake
Atractus bocourti Boulenger, 1894 – Bocourt's ground snake
Atractus boimirim Passos, Prudente & J.D. Lynch, 2016
Atractus boulengerii Peracca, 1896
Atractus caete 
Atractus careolepis 
Atractus carrioni Parker, 1930 – Parker's ground snake, Carrion's ground snake
Atractus caxiuana 
Atractus cerberus  – Cerberus ground snake
Atractus charitoae 
Atractus chthonius 
Atractus clarki Dunn & Bailey, 1939 – Clark's ground snake
Atractus collaris  – collared ground snake
Atractus crassicaudatus (A.M.C. Duméril, Bibron & A.H.A. Duméril, 1854) – thickhead ground snake
Atractus dapsilis Melo-Sampaio, Passos, Fouquet, Prudente & Torres-Carvajal, 2019
Atractus darienensis 
Atractus depressiocellus 
Atractus discovery Arteaga, Quezada, Vieira, & Guayasamin, 2022
Atractus duboisi 
Atractus duidensis Roze, 1961 – Venezuela ground snake
Atractus dunni Savage, 1955 – Dunn's ground snake 
Atractus echidna 
Atractus ecuadorensis Savage, 1955 – Ecuadorean ground snake
Atractus edioi 
Atractus elaps (Günther, 1858) – black ground snake
Atractus emigdioi Gonzalez-Sponga, 1971 – Emigdio's ground snake
Atractus emmeli (Boettger, 1888) – Emmel's ground snake, Boettger's ground snake
Atractus eriki 
Atractus erythromelas Boulenger, 1903 –  red-black ground snake
Atractus esepe  – indistinct ground snake
Atractus favae (de Filippi, 1840) – Filippi's ground snake
Atractus flammigerus (F. Boie, 1827) – flaming ground snake
Atractus franciscopaivai 
Atractus francoi 
Atractus fuliginosus (Hallowell, 1845) – Hallowell's ground snake
Atractus gaigeae Savage, 1955 – Gaige's ground snake
Atractus gigas  – giant ground snake
Atractus guentheri (Wucherer, 1861) – Günther's ground snake
Atractus heliobelluomini 
Atractus heyeri Esqueda & McDiarmid, 2015
Atractus hoogmoedi 
Atractus hostilitractus 
Atractus imperfectus 
Atractus indistinctus Prado, 1940 – indistinct ground snake
Atractus insipidus Roze, 1961
Atractus iridescens Peracca, 1896 – iridescent ground snake
Atractus lancinii Roze, 1961 – Lancini's ground snake
Atractus lasallei Amaral, 1931 – Lasalle's ground snake
Atractus latifrons (Günther, 1868) – broadhead ground snake
Atractus lehmanni Boettger, 1898 – Lehmann's ground snake
Atractus loveridgei Amaral, 1930 – Loveridge's ground snake 
Atractus macondo 
Atractus maculatus (Günther, 1858) – spotted ground snake
Atractus major Boulenger, 1894 – brown ground snake
Atractus manizalesensis Prado, 1940
Atractus mariselae Lancini, 1969 – Marisela's ground snake
Atractus marthae Meneses-Pelayo & Passos, 2019
Atractus matthewi 
Atractus medusa 
Atractus melanogaster F. Werner, 1916 – blackbelly ground snake
Atractus melas Boulenger, 1908 – dark ground snake
Atractus meridensis 
Atractus michaelsabini Arteaga, Quezada, Vieira, & Guayasamin, 2022
Atractus micheleae 
Atractus microrhynchus (Cope, 1868)
Atractus mijaresi , 2005
Atractus modestus Boulenger, 1894 – modest ground snake
Atractus multicinctus (Jan, 1865) – banded ground snake
Atractus multidentatus 
Atractus nasutus 
Atractus natans 
Atractus nawa 
Atractus nicefori Amaral, 1930 – northern ground snake
Atractus nigricauda Schmidt & Walker, 1943 – black-headed ground snake
Atractus nigriventris Amaral, 1933 – black-ventered ground snake
Atractus obesus Marx, 1960 – fat ground snake
Atractus obtusirostris F. Werner, 1916 – bignose ground snake
Atractus occidentalis Savage, 1955 – western ground snake
Atractus occipitoalbus (Jan, 1862) – gray ground snake
Atractus ochrosetrus 
Atractus oculotemporalis Amaral, 1932 – Hispanic ground snake
Atractus orcesi 
Atractus pachacamac 
Atractus paisa 
Atractus pamplonensis Amaral, 1937 – Pamplona ground snake
Atractus pantostictus 
Atractus paraguayensis F. Werner, 1924
Atractus paucidens Despax, 1910 – Despax's ground snake
Atractus pauciscutatus Schmidt & Walker, 1943 – little-scaled ground snake
Atractus peruvianus (Jan, 1862) – Peru ground snake
Atractus poeppigi (Jan, 1862) – basin ground snake
Atractus potschi 
Atractus punctiventris Amaral, 1933 – pointed ground snake
Atractus resplendens F. Werner, 1901 – resplendent ground snake
Atractus reticulatus (Boulenger, 1885) – reticulate ground snake
Atractus riveroi Roze, 1961 – Rivero's ground snake
Atractus ronnie 
Atractus roulei Despax, 1910 – Roule's ground snake
Atractus sanctaemartae Dunn, 1946 – St. Marta's ground snake
Atractus sanguineus Prado, 1944 – bloody ground snake
Atractus savagei Salazar-Valenzuela, Torres-Carvajal & Passos, 2014 – Savage’s ground snake
Atractus schach (F. Boie, 1827) – Schach's ground snake
Atractus serranus Amaral, 1930 – Sao Paulo ground snake
Atractus snethlageae Cunha & Nascimento, 1983
Atractus spinalis 
Atractus steyermarki Roze, 1958
Atractus stygius 
Atractus surucucu 
Atractus tamaensis 
Atractus tamessari 
Atractus taphorni 
Atractus tartarus 
Atractus thalesdelemai 
Atractus titanicus 
Atractus torquatus (A.M.C. Duméril, Bibron & A.H.A. Duméril, 1854) – neckband ground snake
Atractus touzeti 
Atractus trefauti Melo-Sampaio, Passos, Fouquet, Prudente & Torres-Carvajal, 2019
Atractus trihedrurus  – southern ground snake
Atractus trilineatus Wagler, 1828 – three-lined ground snake	
Atractus trivittatus Amaral, 1933 – three-banded ground snake
Atractus turikensis 
Atractus typhon 
Atractus ukupacha 
Atractus variegatus Prado, 1942 – variegated ground snake
Atractus ventrimaculatus Boulenger, 1905 – speckled ground snake
Atractus vertebralis Boulenger, 1904 – vertebral ground snake
Atractus vertebrolineatus Prado, 1941 – striped ground snake
Atractus vittatus 
Atractus wagleri Prado, 1945 – Wagler's ground snake
Atractus werneri Peracca, 1914 – Werner's ground snake
Atractus zebrinus 
Atractus zgap Arteaga, Quezada, Vieira, & Guayasamin, 2022
Atractus zidoki Gasc & Rodriques, 1979 – Zidok's ground snake

References

Further reading
Freiberg M (1982). Snakes of South America. Hong Kong: T.F.H. Publications. 189 pp. . (Genus Atractus, pp. 89–92).
Passos P, Fernandes R, Bérnils RS, Moura-Leite JC de (2010). "Taxonomic revision of the Brazilian Atlantic Forest Atractus (Reptilia: Serpentes: Dipdadidae)". Zootaxa 2364: 1-63.
Wagler [JG] (1828). "Auszüge aus seinem [sic] Systema Amphibiorum". Isis von Oken 21: 740-744. (Atractus, new genus, pp. 741–742). (in German and Latin).

Atractus
Snakes of South America
Snake genera
Taxa named by Johann Georg Wagler